Events in the year 2015 in Brazil:

Incumbents

Federal government 
 President: Dilma Rousseff
 Vice President: Michel Temer

Governors
 Acre: Tião Viana 
 Alagoas: Teotônio Vilela Filho (until 1 January), Renan Filho (starting 1 January)
 Amapa: Camilo Capiberibe (until 1 January), Waldez Góes (starting 1 January)
 Amazonas: José Melo 
 Bahia: Jacques Wagner (until 1 January), Rui Costa (starting 1 January)
 Ceará: Cid Gomes (until 1 January), Camilo Santana (starting 1 January)
 Espírito Santo: Renato Casagrande (until 1 January), Paulo Hartung (starting 1 January)
 Goiás: Marconi Perillo
 Maranhão: Arnaldo Melo (until 1 January), Flávio Dino (starting 1 January)
 Mato Grosso: Pedro Taques
 Mato Grosso do Sul: André Puccinelli (until 1 January), Reinaldo Azambuja (starting 1 January)
 Minas Gerais: Fernando Damata Pimentel (starting 1 January)
 Pará: Simão Jatene
 Paraíba: Ricardo Coutinho
 Paraná: Beto Richa
 Pernambuco: João Lyra Neto (until 1 January), Paulo Câmara (starting 1 January)
 Piauí: Zé Filho (until 1 January), Wellington Dias (starting 1 January)
 Rio de Janeiro: Luiz Fernando Pezão (starting 1 January)
 Rio Grande do Norte: Rosalba Ciarlini Rosado (until 1 January), Robinson Faria (starting 1 January)
 Rio Grande do Sul: Tarso Genro (until 1 January), José Ivo Sartori (starting 1 January)
 Rondônia: Confúcio Moura
 Roraima: Suely Campos
 Santa Catarina: Raimundo Colombo
 São Paulo: Geraldo Alckmin
 Sergipe: Jackson Barreto
 Tocantins: Sandoval Cardoso (until 1 January), Marcelo Miranda (starting 1 January)

Vice governors
 Acre: 	Carlos César Correia de Messias (until 1 January), Maria Nazareth Melo de Araújo Lambert (starting 1 January)
 Alagoas: José Thomaz da Silva Nonô Neto (until 1 January), José Luciano Barbosa da Silva (starting 1 January)
 Amapá: Doralice Nascimento de Souza (until 1 January), João Bosco Papaléo Paes (starting 1 January)
 Amazonas: José Melo de Oliveira (until 1 January), José Henrique Oliveira (starting 1 January)
 Bahia: Otto Alencar (until 1 January), João Leão (starting 1 January)
 Ceará: Domingos Gomes de Aguiar Filho (until 1 January), Maria Izolda Cela de Arruda Coelho (starting 1 January)
 Espírito Santo: Givaldo Vieira da Silva (until 1 January), César Roberto Colnago (starting 1 January)
 Goiás: José Eliton de Figueiredo Júnior 
 Maranhão: Joaquim Washington Luiz de Oliveira (until 1 January), Carlos Orleans Brandão Júnior (starting 1 January)
 Mato Grosso: Francisco Tarquínio Daltro (until 1 January), Carlos Henrique Baqueta Fávaro (starting 1 January)
 Mato Grosso do Sul: Simone Tebet (until 1 January), Rose Modesto (starting 1 January)
 Minas Gerais: Alberto Pinto Coelho Júnior (until 1 January), Antônio Eustáquio Andrade Ferreira (starting 1 January)
 Pará: Helenilson Cunha Pontes (until 1 January), José da Cruz Marinho (starting 1 January)
 Paraíba: Rômulo José de Gouveia (until 1 January), Lígia Feliciano (starting 1 January)
 Paraná: Flávio José Arns (until 1 January), Maria Aparecida Borghetti (starting 1 January)
 Pernambuco: João Soares Lyra Neto (until 1 January) Raul Jean Louis Henry Júnior (starting 1 January)
 Piaui: Antônio José de Moraes Souza Filho (until 1 January) Margarete de Castro Coelho (starting 1 January)
 Rio de Janeiro: Francisco Dornelles (starting January 1) 
 Rio Grande do Norte: Robinson Faria (until 1 January), Fábio Dantas (starting 1 January)
 Rio Grande do Sul: Jorge Alberto Duarte Grill (until 1 January) José Paulo Dornelles Cairoli (starting 1 January)  
 Rondônia:  Airton Pedro Gurgacz (until 1 January),  (starting 1 January)
 Roraima: Francisco de Assis Rodrigues (until 1 January), Paulo César Justo Quartiero (starting 1 January)
 Santa Catarina: Eduardo Pinho Moreira
 São Paulo: Guilherme Afif Domingos (until 1 January), Márcio França (starting 1 January)
 Sergipe: Jackson Barreto de Lima (until 1 January), Belivaldo Chagas Silva (starting 1 January)
 Tocantins: Cláudia Telles de Menezes Pires Martins Lelis (starting 1 January)

Events

January
 January 6 - Two commuter trains collide at Mesquita, Rio de Janeiro, injuring 158 people.

February
 February 24 - The judge in the insider trading trial of Eike Batista is videotaped driving one of his seized vehicles.

March
 March 15
Hundreds of thousands of people in Brazil protest against corruption and denounce the government of President Dilma Rousseff.
51 people die in a bus accident near Joinville.

September
 September 17 - The Supreme Court of Brazil ruled that campaign donations from businesses should be illegal.

November
 November 5 - An iron ore tailings dam in Bento Rodrigues, a subdistrict of Mariana, Brazil, suffered a catastrophic failure, causing flooding, killing 17 and injuring 16.

Arts and culture 
2014–15 Brazil network television schedule
2015–16 Brazil network television schedule
2015 in Brazilian television
List of Brazilian films of 2015

Sports 
2015 in Brazilian football
Brazil at the 2015 Pan American Games
UFC Fight Night: Bigfoot vs. Mir

Deaths
January 4 – Haroldo Lara, 80, Brazilian Olympic swimmer (1952, 1956).
January 12 – Inge Vermeulen, 30, Brazilian-born Dutch field hockey player (national team), European champion (2009).
January 16 – Vivaldo Frota, 86, Brazilian politician, Governor of Amazonas (1990–1991).
January 20 – Ricardo dos Santos, 24, Brazilian surfer, shot.
January 24 – Maria Della Costa, 89, Brazilian actress (Brasileiras e Brasileiros), pulmonary edema.
January 29 – José Martins da Silva, 78, Brazilian Roman Catholic prelate, Archbishop of Porto Velho (1982–1997).
February 2 – Dalmo Gaspar, 82, Brazilian footballer (Santos).
February 4 – Odete Lara, 85, Brazilian actress, heart attack.
February 12 – Tomie Ohtake, 101, Japanese-born Brazilian artist, heart failure.
February 20 – , 78, Brazilian evangelist, founder of the God is Love Pentecostal Church.
February 22 – Renato Rocha, 53, musician and songwriter (Legião Urbana), cardiac arrest.
March 3 – Octávio Mobiglia, 83, Brazilian Olympic swimmer (1952, 1956).
March 8 – Inezita Barroso, 90, Brazilian folk singer.
March 14 – Therezinha Zerbini, 86, Brazilian lawyer and feminist activist.
March 22 – , 74, Brazilian actor, pneumonia.
March 27 – Carlos Falchi, 70, Brazilian-born American accessories designer.
April 9 – João Alves dos Santos, 58, Brazilian Roman Catholic prelate, Bishop of Paranaguá.
April 10 – Bárbara Heliodora, 91, Brazilian theatre critic.
April 12 – Paulo Brossard, 90, Brazilian jurist and politician.
April 13 – Antônio Alberto Guimarães Rezende, 89, Brazilian Roman Catholic prelate, Bishop of Caetité (1981–2002).
April 20 – Cláudio Cunha, 68, Brazilian actor.
April 20 – Pedro Eugênio, 65, Brazilian politician, MP (1998–2014), complications from surgery.
April 23 – , 65, Brazilian television director and producer.
April 27 – Inês Etienne Romeu, 72, Brazilian political prisoner.
April 28 – Antônio Abujamra, 82, Brazilian actor and director.
April 29 – Valmir Louruz, 71, Brazilian football manager (Juventude, Pelotas).
April 29 – Rodrigo Gularte, 42, Brazilian drug trafficker
May 2 – Sarah Correa, 22, Brazilian swimmer, struck by car.
May 4 – Vicente Joaquim Zico, 88, Brazilian Roman Catholic prelate, Coadjutor Archbishop (1980–1990) and Archbishop of Belém do Pará (1990–2004).
May 10 – Luiz Henrique da Silveira, 75, Brazilian politician, Senator (since 2011), Governor of Santa Catarina (2003–2006, 2007–2010), Minister of Science and Technology (1987–1988), heart attack.
May 14 – Geraldo Majela de Castro, 84, Brazilian Roman Catholic prelate, Coadjutor Bishop (1982–1988) and Archbishop of Montes Claros (1988–2007).
May 16 – Elias Gleizer, 81, Brazilian actor, circulatory failure.
May 26 – Ubirajara Ribeiro Martins, 82, Brazilian entomologist.
June 8 – Aldo da Rosa, 97, Brazilian electrical engineer.
June 12 – Fernando Brant, 68, Brazilian writer. 
June 12 – José Messias, 86, Brazilian musician and television personality.
June 14 – Zito, 82, Brazilian footballer, World Cup-winning team member (1958, 1962), complications of a stroke.
June 22 – Carlinhos, 77, Brazilian football player and coach.
June 24 – Cristiano Araújo, 29, Brazilian singer and songwriter, traffic collision.
June 24 – Clovis Bueno, 74, Brazilian art director (Kiss of the Spider Woman).
July 21 – Luiz Paulo Conde, 80, Brazilian politician and architect, Mayor of Rio de Janeiro (1997–2001).
 August 2 – Içami Tiba, 74, Brazilian psychiatrist and writer.
 August 26 – Carmelo Domênico Recchia, 93, Italian-born Brazilian Roman Catholic prelate, last Territorial Abbot of Claraval (1976–1999).
 September 4 – Joel Rufino dos Santos, 74, Brazilian historian and writer.	
 September 5 – Alacid Nunes, 90, Brazilian politician, Governor of Pará (1966–1971, 1979–1983).
 September 13 – Betty Lago, 60, Brazilian actress, gallbladder cancer.
 September 13 – Vivinho, 54, Brazilian footballer (Vasco).
 September 16 – Clovis Acosta Fernandes, 60, Brazilian celebrity, cancer.
 September 30 – Caio César Ignácio Cardoso de Melo, 27, Brazilian voice actor (Harry Potter) and policeman, shot.
 October 4 – José Eduardo Dutra, 58, Brazilian businessman (Petrobras) and politician, Senator (since 1994).
 October 4 – João Leithardt Neto, 57, Brazilian footballer, Olympic silver medalist (1984), liver cancer.
 October 7 – Maria Lúcia Prandi, 70, Brazilian academic and politician, cancer.
 October 7 – Jorge Andrade, 73, Brazilian footballer (S. C. Internacional), cancer.
 October 7 – Ângelo da Cunha Pinto, 66, Brazilian-Portuguese chemist.
 October 9 – , 83, Brazilian singer.
 October 14 – , 77, Brazilian music producer and television director.
 October 15 – Carlos Alberto Brilhante Ustra, 83, Brazilian military officer, cancer.
 October 18 – João Carlos Sobreira, 32, Brazilian motorcyclist (Superbike), race collision.
 October 20 – Lourival de Almeida Filho, 74, Brazilian footballer (Sport Club Corinthians Paulista).
 October 20 – Yoná Magalhães, 80, Brazilian actress.
 October 21 – Sylvia Athayde, 75, Brazilian professor (UFBA) and museologist.
 October 25 – , 72, Brazilian politician and lawyer, MLA of Minas Gerais (1975–2000), helicopter crash.
 October 27 – Ada Chaseliov, 63, Brazilian telenovela actress, lymphoma.
 October 28 – Jorge Scarso, 99, Italian-born Brazilian Roman Catholic prelate, Bishop of Patos de Minas (1967–1992).
 October 29 – Wilson Campos, 65, Brazilian footballer (Santos, Guarani), liver cancer.
 October 29 – Lucídio Portela Nunes, 93, Brazilian politician, Governor of Piauí (1979–1983).
 October 29 – Harry Bernardo Schwarz, 91, Brazilian footballer (SC Internacional).
 November 3 – , 53, Brazilian footballer (Coritiba), heart attack.
 November 6 – , 102, Brazilian musician and tap dancer.
 November 6 – Beni Veras, 80, Brazilian politician, Governor of Ceará (2002).
 November 7 – João Verle, 75, Brazilian politician, Mayor of Porto Alegre (2002–2004).
 November 9 – Sebastião do Rego Barros Netto, 75, Brazilian lawyer and diplomat, Ambassador to Russia (1990–1994) and Argentina (1999–2001), fall from building.
 November 10 – , 61, Brazilian journalist (TV Globo), cancer.
 November 27 – José Benedito Simão, 64, Brazilian Roman Catholic prelate, Bishop of Assis (since 2009).
 November 28 – Nauro Machado, 80, Brazilian poet.
 December 5 – Marília Pêra, 72, Brazilian actress (Pixote, Better Days Ahead), lung cancer.
 December 9 – Juvenal Juvêncio, 81, Brazilian lawyer and sports director.
 December 19 – Selma Reis, 55, Brazilian actress and singer.
 December 21 – Jupiter Apple, singer-songwriter and multi-instrumentalist (TNT, Os Cascavelletes), multiple organ failure.
 December 25 – , 61, Brazilian singer, gunshot.

See also 
2015 in Brazilian football

References 

 
2010s in Brazil
Years of the 21st century in Brazil
Brazil
Brazil